Boxing Subdistrict is a subdistrict located at the northeast of Daxing District, Beijing, China. It constitututed part of Beijing Economic-Technological Development Area, and is under the administration of the area. It borders Ronghua Subdistrict in the north, Majuqiao Town in the east, Yinghai Town in the south and west, and Qingyundian Town in the southwest. It was founded from portions of Yizhuang Town and Yinghai Town in 2014.

Administrative divisions 
By the end of 2021, there was only one residential community within Boxing Subdistrict: Zhongxin Huayuan Community (中芯花园社区). Its Administrative Division Code was 110115013001.

Gallery

See also 
 List of township-level divisions of Beijing

References 

Daxing District
Subdistricts of Beijing